Sir Leslie Brian Freeston  (11 August 1892 – 16 July 1958) was a British colonial official.

Career
Freeston was educated at Willaston School and New College, Oxford. After service in the London Regiment of the British Army in  the First World War he joined the then Colonial Office in 1919. He was Governor of the Leeward Islands 1944–48; Governor of Fiji and High Commissioner, Western Pacific 1948–52; Secretary-General of the South Pacific Commission 1951–54. Freeston was knighted on 1 January 1945.

Notes

Sources
FREESTON, Sir (Leslie) Brian, Who Was Who, A & C Black, 1920–2015 (online edition, Oxford University Press, 2014)
Sir Brian Freeston – Former Governor Of Fiji (obituary), The Times, London, 17 July 1958, page 12

External links

1892 births
1958 deaths
Military personnel from Middlesex
London Regiment officers
British Army personnel of World War I
Governors of the Leeward Islands
Governors of Fiji
Pacific Community people
High Commissioners for the Western Pacific
Officers of the Order of the British Empire
Knights Commander of the Order of St Michael and St George
British Leeward Islands people of World War II
Alumni of New College, Oxford